The 2009–10 season was Derby County's 111th season in the Football League. It is their 42nd season in the second division of English football and their second consecutive season in the second tier following an 18th-placed finish in the previous campaign. Derby struggled against relegation for much of the season, but a run of just two defeats in the final 10 fixtures saw the club finish in 14th, their third highest finish in their respective division in the previous ten years. The Derby Evening Telegraph described the campaign as "Good in patches, poor in others, and ultimately frustrating."

The season was Nigel Clough's first full season in the job following his appointment in January 2009. The club started the season with odds of 21/1 for the title, though the media prediction was that they would improve greatly on the previous campaign's struggles and push for a playoff place. This proved overly optimistic, however, as the club battled relegation from the Championship for the fifth time in eight seasons. Although the club never fell into the bottom three during the campaign (the lowest position was 20th) it spent just six fixtures in the top half of the table, only one of which was achieved after August. A lack of consistency was one reason; not only in results (the club never recording more than two consecutive victories) but also in the club's inability to field a consistent team selection. A club record 40 players represented the club, with only 6 players making 30 or more league starts, and an over-reliance on loanees (14 players signing temporary deals over the season) also played a part, as did injuries; one match, away to Ipswich Town in October, came at the height of the club's injury problems and saw them unable to even name a full complement of substitutes such was the lack of players available. A purple patch of form in February saw the club end local rivals Nottingham Forest's 19 match unbeaten run, inflict eventual-Champions Newcastle United's biggest defeat of the season (3–0) and hit five in a match for the first time in three years when they edged out Preston North End 5–3 at Pride Park, but a run of just three wins in twelve through the end of February until the end of April, ensured that safety was not achieved until the 44th fixture of the season after a 1–1 draw at home to relegation rivals Crystal Palace. One bright point to the campaign came with the reserves successful The Central League Division One Central Section campaign, which saw them finish top and become the first Derby reserves team to win the title since Arthur Cox's reserves claimed it in the 1985–86 season. It was also the first time a Derby County reserves side had won its respective division since the club successfully captured the Premier Reserve League in 2000–01.

The club sold 21,406 season tickets for the 2009–10 season and had an average home attendance of 29,207 (down from 29,440 the previous season), second only to Champions Newcastle United's 43,388	 and over 4,000 ahead of third placed Sheffield United. The ground operated at 86.9% capacity, putting it third behind Cardiff City and Blackpool. These averages made Derby the 12th best supported club in the country for the third consecutive season.

Team kit
The team kit for the 2009–10 season is produced by Adidas and sponsored by Bombardier. The new home kit, the fifth in as many years, was officially unveiled at a special event on Derby market place on 3 July 2009 and the away kit was launched in a special exhibition at the Westfield Centre on 4 August 2009. The club retained the Argentina inspired third kit from the 2008–09 season.

Review

Preseason
The day after the final game of the 2008–09 season, a 3–1 defeat by Watford, Clough announced his intention to cut the playing staff by up to 17 players (including loanees), with the first casualties being Andy Todd and Paris Simmons, whose contracts were not renewed, and the loanees Nathan Ellington, Barry Bannan, John Eustace, Przemysław Kaźmierczak and Nacer Barazite returning to their parent clubs. Todd signed for Perth Glory and was later joined there by Mile Sterjovski, who left the club on a free transfer.

Others leaving the club were Tyrone Mears, who signed for Premier League club Burnley for a fee of £500k, rising to £600k with add-ons, Emanuel Villa, who moved to Mexican club Cruz Azul for an undisclosed fee, thought to be around £1.7m, and Lewis Price joined Football League One Brentford on a season-long loan. Liam Dickinson was the subject of two 'small' bids from Norwich City, both of which were rejected, leaving Dickinson to criticise the club for placing an 'unrealistic' valuation on him, before moving to Brighton & Hove Albion for £300,000. Lewin Nyatanga joined Bristol City for an undisclosed fee, thought to be around £500,000. Additionally, Martin Albrechtsen was told he was free to find a new club, and Claude Davis entered into negotiations to cancel his contract two years early.

Rumours consistently surfaced regarding Player of the Year Rob Hulse and Kris Commons being sold, with Clough stating he was 'unsurprised' by speculation linking Hulse with a £3m move to Middlesbrough, and Kris Commons with £3m and £4m moves to Celtic and Everton respectively.

Clough's first signings were non-League pair Jake Buxton from Burton Albion on an initial one-year deal and Ben Pringle from Ilkeston Town. They were joined by Exeter City's Dean Moxey, who signed for an initial £300,000 and former Norwich City winger Lee Croft and ex-Burton Albion goalkeeper Saul Deeney on free transfers. There was also a drawn out chase for Blackpool defender Shaun Barker, who also attracted interest from local rivals Nottingham Forest. An initial offer of £400,000, rising to £500,000 was rejected, with a rumoured £750,000 plus add-ons later offered. Other sources suggested that both Derby and Forest has made offers of £700,000 plus an unnamed player (rumoured to be Liam Dickinson, who had had a loan spell at Blackpool the previous campaign). He eventually signed on 15 July 2009 for a fee of £900,000.

On top of these signings, several trialists were taken. Of those trialled, the club declined to sign former Norwich City captain Mark Fotheringham and Cambridge City's Scott Neilson. A loan was agreed, in principal, for Arsenal's Mark Randall, though the club declined to sign the player after he failed to impress on trial, and initial contract talks were held with Patrick Kisnorbo, before he eventually joined Leeds United. There were also trials given to ex-Stoke City youngster Mark Grocott, Berwick Rangers forward Fraser McLaren and Juventus midfielder David Junior Toukam.

There were also links with Crewe Alexandra's John Brayford, Rangers midfielder Charlie Adam, Blackburn goalkeeper Frank Fielding and Charlton Athletic's Nicky Bailey.

August
Derby kicked off the 2009–10 season with a home match against newly promoted Peterborough United. Three players, Dean Moxey, Lee Croft and Jake Buxton, made their full debuts, with a fourth, Ben Pringle, coming on as a substitute. Gary Teale's 87th-minute goal sealed a 2–1 win and ensured that the club won its opening game of the season for the first time since 2002 and Robbie Savage's performance saw him named in the Championship Team of the week. The club's next three games were all away from home. A 2–1 defeat away to League Two side Rotherham United, which saw Derby exit the League Cup, a competition in which they reached the semi finals the previous season, in the First Round was followed by two league fixtures; a 3–2 defeat at Scunthorpe United, a match which saw Paul Green perform well enough to earn a pace in the Championship Team of the week, and a 0–0 draw away to Blackpool, which saw Stephen Bywater celebrate his 100th appearance for the club with his first clean sheet of the season and Robbie Savage replace Paul Connolly as team captain. The club's return to Pride Park saw them grab their second win of the season, coming from behind to beat Plymouth Argyle 2–1,
Miles Addison scoring the winning goal and earning a place in the Championship team of the week. The first East Midlands derby at the season completed the opening month's fixtures, with Derby suffering their first defeat by Nottingham Forest in six years as they lost 3–2 at the City Ground. Following the match a scuffle broke out between the Derby and Forest players after Nathan Tyson celebrated in front of the Derby County support, an incident the FA said they would investigate with some "urgency", the end result of which saw both club's fined for failing to control their players and Tyson charged with improper conduct. Derby were fined £20,000, of which £10,000 was suspended, and ordered to pay £400 costs, Nottingham Forest were fined £25,000, of which £10,000 was suspended, and ordered to pay £1,200 costs and Tyson was fined £5,000 and given a two-match ban and ordered to pay £400 costs.

Away from the pitch, Clough continued to restructure the club's playing staff. Tottenham Hotspur midfielder Jake Livermore was brought in on an initial one-month loan, which was extended to the end of the year. He was joined by Leicester City's Paul Dickov, who also signed on loan until 1 January 2010. Southend United's young midfielder Medi Abalimba was signed for an undisclosed fee after a successful trial spell and former West Ham United goalkeeper Jimmy Walker was also taken on trial. These additions saw the contracts of Roy Carroll, Claude Davis and Martin Albrechtsen cancelled by mutual consent. Luke Varney was also sent out on loan to Sheffield Wednesday for a second time, this time for four months. A blow was dealt when Chris Porter was ruled out until Christmas after having surgery on his hip, though his strike partner Rob Hulse committed his future to the club in the face of speculation of an imminent £5m bid from Middlesbrough.

Financially, the club announced that it had cut £400,000 off of the amount paid to player's agents for the first six months of 2009 in comparison to the same period at the end of 2008 and had reduced its debt to just the £15m mortgage on Pride Park Stadium, down from a £31m debt 18 months previously.

September
The summer Transfer deadline day on 1 September saw Derby make just one move in the market, as Jordan Stewart moved to Sheffield United in part exchange for Lee Hendrie. There was also interest in other Derby players, with Ipswich Town making a bid for Paul Connolly which was rejected and Rob Hulse the subject of a £4m+ bid from Middlesbrough. Hulse rejected the opportunity to move, citing his fondness for club as the reason. It was later revealed that, had the deal gone through, Derby had set up a loan move for Wolverhampton Wanderers striker Sam Vokes as a replacement. An additional striker was eventually brought into the club with the loan signing of Everton youngster James Vaughan until January 2010 on 18 September. Derby increased their defensive options towards the end of the month with the addition of Swedish International right back Fredrik Stoor, who joined on an initial months loan from Premiership side Fulham and Clough revealed the club still has an active interest in young Blackburn goalkeeper Frank Fielding and would make a fresh approach in the January transfer window. Youngsters Greg Mills and Jermaine Johnson also moved out on loan to Solihull Moors and Stafford Rangers respectively.

On the pitch, the club's poor run of results continued as four of the month's five fixtures ended in defeat, including a 6–1 mauling at Cardiff City. The only win came courtesy of an 85th-minute goal from Gary Teale, his third of the season, in a 1–0 home win over Bristol City, a match which saw Dean Moxey perform well enough to feature in the Championship Team of the week. The run coincided with a number of injuries to key first team personnel including Kris Commons, Stephen Pearson, Paul Green and Steve Davies.

Miles Addison became the first Derby player to be capped by the England Under-21s for two years when he came on as a substitute against Greece in a European Under-21 Football Championship qualifier on 8 September. The next day he was nominated for the Championship Player of the month award for August which was won by Newcastle striker Shola Ameobi. Club captain Robbie Savage was charged by the FA for breaches of its regulations regarding agents. Savage and agent George Urquhart were charged over the renegotiation of Savage's Blackburn Rovers contract in 2007, with Urquhart also being charged over Savage's subsequent move to Derby in January 2008. Both Savage and Urquhart were given 14 days to respond to the charges. Savage was eventually left off with a warning, whereas Urquhart was fined £500.

October
October saw Derby's injury crisis hit new heights with the news that loanee James Vaughan would return to his parent club, Everton, to assess a dead leg he had suffered in his debut against Crystal Palace. Vaughan joined 11 other first teamers on the Derby injury list, a scenario which coincided with Nigel Ashley-Jones leaving his position as the club's strength and conditioning coach, and returned to Everton on 23 October, though Derby signalled their intention to re-sign him on loan in January, provided he was fit. Prior to a match against Sheffield Wednesday, Clough dismissed concerns that the clubs run of just 3 points from 18 constituted a relegation battle, insisting that "The table hasn't even settled down yet to the degree it does after 25 matches or may be by Christmas. If we get the three points against Wednesday it is two wins in three games and we will turn the stats round a little bit to suit us." In the event of the match, the club achieved their biggest win of the season so far as they ran out 3–0 winners, with Lee Croft scoring his first for the club and Rob Hulse reaching 100 career league goals and earning a place in the Championship Team of the week. After the international break, the club faced two away fixtures which saw a 0–0 draw at Leicester City followed with a 0–2 defeat at Middlesbrough. Jay McEveley broke his cheek in the match at Middlesbrough, ruling him out for 8 weeks and taking the club's injury tally up to 14. The return to Pride Park saw the club lose 4–2 at home to Q.P.R. despite being 2–0 up. The results saw Derby drop to 19th in the table and saw Clough admit for the first time concern over the team's plight, going as far as to state "We are still clinging on to the hope when everybody is fit we think we can get a side out to compete." He also praised the club's supporters, despite the pelting of the pitch with free T-shirts as the match drew to a close, saying "I didn't think their reaction was too bad after they had just seen us concede four goals at home. I thought generally throughout the game they were magnificent." The Q.P.R. defeat was followed by another loss, 1–0 away to Ipswich Town, for who the result was their first win of the season. With the injury list running at 16 players Clough admitted that he had looked into the possibility of having the fixture called off.

Away from the pitch, Hull City midfielder Bryan Hughes was signed on a monthlong loan with a view to a permanent move, Fredrik Stoor's loan was extended by two months, though there was a 24-hour recall clause inserted by his parent club Fulham and youngsters Mark Dudley and Arnaud Mendy moved to Alfreton Town and Grimsby Town respectively on a one-month loan deals, Clough also admitted an interest in Ipswich Town's Jon Stead (who had had a loan spell with Derby in the 2006–07 promotion campaign), and there were further links with 16-year-old Mandalskameratene goalkeeper Mats Mørch and Plymouth Argyle's Jamie Mackie.

Towards the end of the month, Adam Pearson left his position as Chairman of football after two years at the club, the Official Club Statement reading
"Coming up to the second year anniversary of Adam Pearson's arrival at Derby County Football Club, following lengthy discussions within the Board and investor group, it has been decided by all parties that now is a good time for Adam to pursue new challenges away from Derby County. The decision for Adam to leave has been reached through mutual consent and all parties believe it to be in the best interests of the Club and the individuals involved. The Moor Farm and Pride Park operations will now be unified under the control of Tom Glick, reporting directly into company chairman Andy Appleby."

November
The month started with the club revealing that Mark O'Brien had successfully undergone heart surgery to correct a valve problem, and that he would be able to resume his career following a three- to four-month recovery period. The problem had been discovered during a routing medical scan for academy players. It was also revealed that Jay McEveley's heart has stopped for two minutes during surgery on the cheekbone he had fractured during the defeat at Middlesbrough, though he was revived and was available, whilst wearing a protective mask for the match against Coventry City, joining the returning Rob Hulse, Dean Leacock and Paul Green. Despite falling behind to a fourth-minute goal from Leon Best, Derby won the match 2–1, with Hulse grabbing two goals and missing a penalty, earning himself a place in the Championship Team of the week, earning his second Team of the week of the season. The win ended a three match losing streak, and a four match winless run, and lifted Derby to 17th in the table going into the third international break of the season. The return to action two weeks later saw a match away to Swansea City end in defeat, the first time Derby had lost to the Swans in 26 years. The month ended with a 2–1 victory over Reading, with Derby again coming from a goal down to win, with Rob Hulse scoring the winner to take his tally for the season to 6. The result lifted Derby to 16th in the table.

The return of Bryan Hughes to Hull City following the completion of his one-month loan freed up numbers in terms of loanees, and Leicester City's DJ Campbell was bought in on a monthlong loan, joining Leicester teammate Paul Dickov. A freak injury to reserve goalkeeper Saul Deeney (who was ruled out for six weeks after twisting his ankle when slipping over in the rain after an unplanned fire drill at the hotel the team were staying at prior to the 1–0 defeat at Swansea) heightened the need for a goalkeeper, and Clough was again linked with a move for frequent target, Blackburn Rover's Frank Fielding, though the move was knocked back by Blackburn. Mark Dudley and Gary Mills were loaned out to Hinckley United and Solihull Moors respectively whilst both Jermaine Johnson and Henrik Ojamaa made one-month loan moves to Stafford Rangers. Young Serbian striker Aleksandar Prijović joined OB Odense on trial, where he impressed with a goal in a trial match. Of Prijović, Derby boss Nigel Clough said "They are very interested in taking him in January so we are just trying to get a deal done if they want to do one. If not, we will probably look to get him out on loan. If we can do it before the deadline, we will do. If not, in January." Fellow striker Luke Varney, away on loan at Sheffield Wednesday was also linked with a permanent move away, though Wednesday boss Brian Laws stated  "We're in discussions with Derby, we spoke to them on Tuesday, we've still got to have discussions about what they want to do with the player, bearing in mind he's got two and a bit years left on his contract. We'd be happy to keep Luke Varney but we haven't got any money."

Away from the club, there was controversy surrounding Derby's bid to be a host city for England's 2018 World Cup bid. Derby City Council proposed the raising of £26m through an extra levy of local businesses to help fund the expansion of Pride Park to 45,000 from its current 33,500 capacity for the tournament, which would be reduced to 35,000 to 38,000 after its completion. Carolyn Spencer, from the Derby Federation of Small Businesses, said: "Hairdressers won't benefit, ladies clothes shops, greetings cards shops are not going to benefit. So why should they pay an extra supplementary business rate on top of everything else that they pay to something that is going to give them nothing back whatsoever?" Ultimately Derby was not chosen as one of the host cities for England's World Cup bid.

December
Derby opened the month with a 2–2 draw at home to second placed West Bromwich Albion. D. J. Campbell made his debut as an 86th minute sub and scored a 94th-minute equaliser on his debut. Campbell's Leicester teammate Paul Dickov had given Derby a first half lead before two controversial West Brom goals in the last 10 minutes had looked to turn the game on its head. A 0–0 draw away to Preston North End extended the Rams unbeaten run to three, their longest unbeaten sequence of the campaign, though it also extended their winless away run to 13 matches and 8 months. The run was ended the following Saturday when Chris Porter, who had only returned to the first team after 9 months out as a 71st-minute substitute for Paul Dickov at Preston, scored in the 77th minute in a 1–0 win away at Watford after again coming on as a substitute. Although the Rams remained 17th in the table after the result, it stretched the gap over the relegation places to 7 points and took them to within 7 points of the playoffs. The club's mini revival came to a halt with 0–2 home defeats to Doncaster Rovers and Blackpool over the festive period before a 0–0 draw away to league leaders Newcastle United saw the club end 2009 5 points clear of the drop zone.

The club entered into numerous contract negotiations. Terminations were offered to Ruben Zadkovich and Giles Barnes, with Barnes accepting his on 11 December 2009. Stephen Pearson signed a new contract to take him through to the end of the 2011–12 season and Ben Pringle and Jake Buxton penned new 18-month deals. The club also confirmed it would enter into discussions with a number of other players nearing the end of their current deals, including Gary Teale and Jay McEveley.

Loans also played a large part in the club's transfer dealings throughout the month.  Frederik Stoor and Jake Livermore returned to their parent clubs, Fulham and Tottenham Hotspur respectively, at the end of their loan deals whilst D. J. Campbell's loan spell from Leicester City to 31 January 2010. whilst reports suggested on-loan Goalkeeper Lewis Price's may return earlier than expected fur to being surplus to requirements at Brentford. Mark O'Brien and Jermaine Johnson extended their loan stays at Hinckley United and Stafford Rangers respectively
for a further month Former Newcastle United midfielder Mark Doninger was also taken on trial, scoring for the reserves in a 2–1 win over West Bromwich Albion reserves.

With January approaching, reports suggested Wolves had an eye on Kris Commons for a £1.5m fee and Luke Varney intimated his desire to return to Sheffield Wednesday, either temporarily or permanently, following the completion of his second loan spell with the club. Coming in, the club were linked with an £800k move for Bournemouth's Brett Pitman and moves for
Swindon Town's Charlie Austin and Oldham Athletic's Chris O'Grady. There were also fresh links with £400k Crewe Alexandra defender John Brayford, and Everton's James Vaughan.

January
The FA Cup gave Derby their first match of the new year and Kris Commons scored Derby's first goal with a 52nd-minute equaliser away to Millwall in a 1–1 draw in the 3rd Round. Derby won the replay 10 days later, 5–3 on penalties after a second 1–1 draw in front of a record Pride Park Stadium low of just 7, 183. This gave the club a fourth round tie with Doncaster Rovers, which ended in a 1–0 victory thanks to Jay McEveley's 88th-minute winner, taking Derby through to the Fifth Round for the second successive season.

The first leg against Millwall had marked Nigel Clough's 1st anniversary in charge of Derby. Of his time at the club Clough said "I have thoroughly enjoyed the year, it has been hard work but I've relished it. We know we haven't made progress as quickly as we would have hoped, mainly because of the injuries that have hampered us right from pre-season. We still believe we can achieve a good position this season in the Championship and build on that from there." With the winter storms of 2010, Derby's home match against Scunthorpe was one of only four Championship fixtures to go ahead on the weekend of the 9/10 January. The match saw the Rams crash to their third straight home defeat, and their biggest of the season, with a 4–1 loss and saw goalscorer Kris Commons admit that the club were in a relegation battle and Clough described it as his "lowest moment", equating it to the 2–0 home defeat by Q.P.R. in his first game in charge. The match led to some controversy when BBC Radio Derby commentator Colin Gibson insinuated that some of the Derby players were displeased with Clough's backroom staff, leading to club captain Robbie Savage to launch into a scathing attack on the station, claiming it had an agenda against the club and criticising them of being overly negative towards the club. The fall out led to chief executive Tom Glick to come out in support of Clough's management of the club, stating "A year ago we were convinced we made the right decision [appointing Clough] and we're still convinced." On the back of this Derby took 6 points from their next three games, a 1–0 defeat away to Plymouth Argyle sandwiched by a comprehensive 3–0 win away to a Peterborough United side which was reduced to nine men, with Stephen Bywater and D. J. Campbell playing well enough to earn a place in the Championship Team of the week, the first Derby players to make the team since November and a 1–0 home win over local rivals Nottingham Forest. The fixture, as it had been in August, proved controversial as a mass melee again broke out towards the end of the game as Chris Gunter pushed Jay McEveley whilst the latter was taking a throw-in. The FA announced they would investigate the brawl whilst former Derby manager Billy Davies claimed that Nigel Clough had "attacked" him during the melee and made a formal complaint to the League Manager's Association. After investigating the fracas, the FA fined both clubs £35,000 as well as ordered payment of the suspended £10,000 fine from the tie at The City Ground earlier in the campaign. Three Derby players were rewarded with a place in the Championship Team of the week after their strong performances against Forest. Stephen Bywater, Shaun Barker and match winner Rob Hulse all received the accolade along with on-loan striker Luke Varney after his two goals helped Sheffield Wednesday beat Plymouth 2–1.

January also saw the opening of the January Transfer Window, and Derby delved into the loan market to sign Bristol City midfielder Lee Johnson and Bolton Wanderers rightback Nicky Hunt on month long deals, with Hunt's later being extended until the end of the season. The first permanent signing of the window was Russell Anderson, who joined on a free until the end of the season following the cancellation of his contract with Sunderland. Luke Varney, Ross Atkins and Greg Mills all left the club on loan joining Sheffield Wednesday, Burton Albion and Macclesfield Town respectively. Ruben Zadkovich followed them out of the club, though his departure was permanent after he accepted the contract termination offered to him the previous month.

February
With 31 January 2010 falling on a Sunday, the last day of the 2010 January Transfer window fell, instead, on 1 February 2010. It proved a busy day for Derby, who signed Manchester City's Javan Vidal and Stoke City's Michael Tonge on loan for the rest of the season, freed Aleksandar Prijović to join Swiss club FC Sion and rejected loan bids for Rob Hulse from both Stoke City and Burnley. There was also a £200k move for Millwall's David Martin which collapsed at the last moment, though Nigel Clough intimated the move may be resurrected as a loan when the Emergency Loan window opened, and it was eventually completed with Martin joining on a season long loan on 9 February 2010. Arsenal's Gilles Sunu followed after, signing on loan until the end of the season. Mark Dudley, Ross Atkins and Alex Forde all made loan moves to non-league Hinckley United, Kidderminister Harriers and Solihull Moors respectively. Macclesfield Town's John Rooney, younger brother of Manchester United forward Wayne, was also taken on a week-long trial.

A 1–1 draw at Sheffield United, which saw Derby stretch their improving away form to just 1 defeat in 6 and Robbie Savage and Jake Buxton make the division's Team of the week, was followed up with a convincing 3–0 win over league leaders Newcastle United to jump up to 14th in the table, the club's highest league position since September 2009. The club then exited the FA Cup in the 5th round for the second consecutive season after a 2–1 defeat at home to Birmingham City, but responded with a 5–3 league win over Preston North End, the first time the club had secured consecutive league wins of the season and the first time they had hit 5 in a league game since April 2007, before consecutive defeats at home to promotion chasing Swansea City and West Bromwich Albion. The Swansea City match was marred by a brawl between the Derby and Swansea players after Gorka Pintado was sent off for a "horror tackle" on Robbie Savage. The match also saw Jay McEveley sent off after two yellow cards. F.A. charged Derby with failing to control their players for the third time in the 2009–10 season and charged McEveley with improper conduct. McEveley admitted the charge and was given a £2,500 fine and warned about his future conduct, whereas the club was charged with failing to control its players and handed a fine of £50,000. Explaining the high figure of the fine, taking Derby's fines for the season up to £115,000, the F.A. stated "The Commission was deeply concerned that this was the third occasion in a period of eight months (following the two fracas with Nottingham Forest) that Derby County FC have been charged with a similar offence. Furthermore, the Commission felt the incident could have easily been avoided by stronger restraint from players from both clubs." As a gesture, the players, led by Robbie Savage and management contributed 25% of their weekly earnings to pay the fine.

March
March began with Javan Vidal's parent club Manchester City activating a 28-day recall clause in the defender's contract, leaving Clough to consider re-entering the loan market with a concrete interest in former Derby Player of the Year Tommy Smith on loan from Portsmouth. However, after Smith suffered a broken cheekbone in Portsmouth's 5–0 defeat at home to Chelsea on 24 March, Clough moved to bring in Wigan Athletic's young polish forward Tomasz Cywka on loan until the end of the season. Several players left on loan, Paul Connolly moving to Sheffield United on a months loan and Lee Hendrie and Ross Atkins moved to
Brighton & Hove Albion and Kidderminster Harriers respectively until the end of the season. Arnaud Mendy was due to join League Two Rotherham United on a similar deal, but the paperwork was not completed in time.

Derby returned to winning ways with a 2–0 home win over Watford, their second league double of the season and saw Shaun Barker's performance earn himself a place in the division's Team of the week. An incredible match followed four days after Watford, when the Rams played at Reading. After conceding an early goal, Stephen Bywater went off with a back injury to be replaced by debutant Saul Deeney in the 13th minute. After Gilles Sunu equalised, Reading retook the lead before Deeney gave away a penalty in the 41st minute and was sent off. With no goalkeeper left on the bench, Deeney was replaced in goal by midfielder and captain Robbie Savage. Reading missed their penalty, but scored twice in the second half to send Derby to a 4–1 defeat. With no goalkeepers available, Clough moved swiftly to capture Liverpool's David Martin on a month's loan. Martin made his debut in a 1–2 defeat at Doncaster Rovers and kept his place for a 2–2 draw with Middlesbrough which put Derby firmly in the relegation dogfight after just one win in six games. Bywater returned the following game and, in his next three appearances earned consecutive Championship Team of the week appearances after keeping clean sheet in a 0–0 draw at Hillsborough against Sheffield Wednesday and in a 1–0 win over 4th placed Leicester City. He was joined by Chris Porter in the Team of the week for the win over Leicester and these results, coupled with a 1–1 draw at Q.P.R. saw Derby finish March on a four match unbeaten run and 9 points clear of the relegation zone with just six games to play.

Away from the pitch, the club was the subject of a £37m take over bid from former chairman Peter Gadsby and two other unnamed local businessmen, who expressed disillusionment with the club's American owners and revealed his intention to buy back the club, funded by equity. The bid was described in a statement released by Gadsby as "a serious and substantial one reflecting the current value of the club." He also promised an additional £5m would be made available to Clough to sign players in the summer and expressed his intention to reinitiate the Pride Park Plaza redevelopment which would "provide superb new amenities for the city and its residents, offer considerable benefits to Rams fans and generate significant revenues for the club." The bid was flatly rejected by the club, who stated ""The club is not for sale, we have received an offer, but there's no interest in selling. We are focused on running the business of a football club."

April and May
April opened with the best possible start as Shaun Barker's 1st half goal in a 1–0 win away to Coventry City took Derby past the 50 points mark, usually enough to secure survival, though a 3–1 defeat at home to Ipswich Town on Easter Monday meant the club was not mathematically safe. The Ipswich result was compounded by Stephen Pearson earning a two match ban after being sent off for foul and abusive language and manager Nigel Clough earning a charge of improper conduct after he was sent to the stands. He was fined £1,000 and given a one-match ban which he served during the final game of the campaign against Cardiff City. A 0–0 draw with Barnsley left the club needing just a point from its final three games to guarantee survival, which duly arrived with a 1–1 draw with Crystal Palace on 17 April 2010. This meant that it was not possible for both Crystal Palace and Sheffield Wednesday to overtake The Rams as they played each other at Hillsborough on the final day of the season and ensured safety and Derby's place in the 2010–11 Football League Championship. Safety meant that Steve Davies and Stephen Bywater were both rested for the remainder of the campaign, Davies having an ankle operation and Bywater resting a sprained rib joint. Bywater's injury resulted in Ross Atkins being recalled from a loan spell with Kidderminster Harriers. Paul Connolly, who Sheffield United loan was initially extended for another week, returned when it became mathematically impossible for Sheffield United to make the playoffs. The season's away fixtures wrapped up with The Rams 13th away defeat of the campaign as the lost 2–1 at Bristol City, meaning Derby had taken just 17 points from a possible 69 on the road. Derby's goalscorer in the game, Stephen Pearson, also underwent knee surgery, ruling him out for four months. Leading scorer Rob Hulse also had an operation on his adductor tendon problem leaving Derby with 14 senior players ruled out for the final game of the season against Cardiff City. One of these, loanee Gilles Sunu, was returned to his parent club, Arsenal, one week early due to the injury. The season ended with a 2–0 win over Cardiff City which helped the club to record a 14th placed league finish and beat the previous season's points total by 2.

Looking towards the 2010–11 season, Alan Tomlinson, who had been with the club as Head Physio since December 2007, left the club to "pursue other interests." The club announced it had agreed a deal to sign ADO Den Haag utility player Danny Buijs once the Dutch football season had finished, and gave Russell Anderson, whose contract expired at the end of the season, a new two-year deal. Goalkeepers Saul Deeney and Ross Atkins also signed new one-year deals. They also confirmed their ongoing interest in Crewe Alexandra defender John Brayford and a desire to continue Michael Tonge's loan from Stoke City into the new campaign. Liverpool youngster Adam Pepper was also taken on trial, scoring in the reserves 3–2 defeat at West Bromwich Albion, and Clough highlighted Scunthorpe United forward Gary Hooper as a "player we admire" and confirmed the loan of Tomasz Cywka from Wigan Athletic was with one eye on next season. The club also announced that Season ticket sales for the following season were matching those for the current campaign, with 2,000 season ticket sales on Friday 16 April 2010 being "one of the single busiest days in the Ticket Office's history." By close of the club's Early Bird offer (which froze 2010–11 Season Tickets at 2009–10 prices) on 18 April 2010, the club had sold 17,357 season tickets, 471 ahead of sales at the same point the previous summer, and claimed they had received calls from "several hundred" supporters who had been prevented from purchasing by the events of the eruption of Eyjafjallajökull.

End of Season squad

Up to and including 2 May 2010.

Transfers

In
Permanent

Loan

 Total spending:  ~ £1.2m

Out
Permanent

Loan

 Total income:  ~ £2.8 million

Notes
 I Vaughan returned to Everton on 24 October due to injury.
 II Manchester City recalled Vidal from his loan spell after activating a clause in the deal.
 III Sunu returned to Arsenal early when a shin injury ruled him out of the final game of the season.
 IV Mills returned to Derby a few days into his second month on loan due to Derby's injury list.
 V Dudley was recalled from his loan spell at Alfreton after 28-day.
 VI Mendy returned to Derby on 30 October, after Grimsby cancelled his loan early
 VII Atkins as recalled on 20 April after a rib injury saw Stephen Bywater ruled out for the rest of the season.

Results

Friendlies

Football League Championship

FA Cup

League Cup

Squad statistics

Appearances, goals and cards
Last Updated – 24 April 2010

Records

Club

(The above statistics refer to league matches only)

Individuals
League

Most league appearances:

Most league goals:

All competitions

Most appearances:

Most Goals:

End-of-season awards

Reserves
As part of the 2009–10 season, Clough announced his attention to bring back a Derby County reserve side which, apart from one season, had been dormant since the end of 2004. The aim was to use the team as a basis in which to blood young players for an eventual role in the first team, something which the lack of a reserve side in recent seasons had hindered. The club entered into
The Central League Division One Central Section, thought not the Central League Cup, and played its home games at Alfreton Town's Impact Arena. The reserves first season back proved successful as they claimed The Central League Division One Central Section title, finishing a point clear of runners-up Burton Albion, and became the first Derby County reserves side to win its respective division since the club successfully captured the Premier Reserve League in 2000–01.

Results

Preseason

Division One Central

Player statistics

References

External links
Derby County FC official website
Derby County FC on Soccerbase 

2009-10
2009–10 Football League Championship by team